Trương Vĩnh Lễ (13 May 1914 – 23 October 2011) was a South Vietnamese politician who served as the first and sole President of the National Assembly of the Republic of Vietnam during the First Republic from 1955 until the 1963 coup which lead to the overthrow and assassination of South Vietnam's President Ngô Đình Diệm. After Diệm's overthrow, he had his assets frozen by the new government of General Dương Văn Minh.

Biography
He was born on 13 May 1914 in Sóc Trăng. He graduated from university with degrees in politics, economics, and business management. He initially filed to run in the 1971 South Vietnamese presidential election but later withdrew.

References 

1914 births
South Vietnamese politicians
Members of the National Assembly (South Vietnam)
2011 deaths